Avena is a genus of grass plants collectively known as the oats.

Avena may also refer to:

Places
 Avena, formerly an independent village, now a frazione (municipal subdivision) of Papasidero, a comune in southern Italy
 Avena, Spanish Abena, an Aragonese village incorporated into the municipality of Jaca in northern Aragon, Spain
 Avena, Illinois, an unincorporated community
 Avena Township, Fayette County, Illinois, a township
 Avena, a populated place in San Joaquin County, California
 Avenas, a former commune of the Rhône department in eastern France
 Avène (Languedocien: Avèna), commune in the Hérault department in southern France

People
 Adolfo Avena (1860–1937), Italian architect
 Antonio Avena (1882–1961), Italian historiographer
 Luigi "Gino" Avena (1898–1980), Italian engineer and architect
 Cristina D'Avena (* 1964), Italian singer and actress
 Blas Avena (1983–2016), American professional mixed martial artist

Other uses
 Avena (drink), a beverage prepared with oatmeal and milk
 Avenà, a red Italian wine grape

See also
 Wild Oats (disambiguation)